Events in the year 2018 in Mauritania.

Incumbents
President: Mohamed Ould Abdel Aziz
Prime Minister: Yahya Ould Hademine (until 29 October); Mohamed Salem Ould Béchir (from 30 October)

Events
1 and 15 September – 2018 Mauritanian parliamentary election

30 October – Mohamed Salem Ould Béchir took over as prime minister, following the resignation of his predecessor, Yahya Ould Hademine, and his government

Deaths

15 January – Moussa Diagana, writer (b. 1946).

17 July – Murabit al-Hajj, Islamic cleric and scholar (b. c.1913).

11 September – Cheikhna Ould Mohamed Laghdaf, diplomat and politician, Foreign Minister.

References

 
2010s in Mauritania
Years of the 21st century in Mauritania
Mauritania
Mauritania